The Netherlands Football League Championship 1953–1954 was contested by 56 teams participating in four divisions. It would be the last season on an amateur basis. The national champion would be determined by a play-off featuring the winners of each division of the Netherlands. FC Eindhoven won this year's championship by beating DOS, PSV Eindhoven and DWS.

New entrants
Eerste Klasse A:
Moving in from Division B: Be Quick 1887, Blauw-Wit Amsterdam, DWS, Elinkwijk, HFC Haarlem and Stormvogels
Promoted from 2nd Division: Oosterparkers
Eerste Klasse B:
Moving in from Division A: DOS, HFC EDO, GVAV Rapiditas, Sneek Wit Zwart, De Volewijckers and VSV
Promoted from 2nd Division: Rigtersbleek
Eerste Klasse C:
Moving in from Division D: Bleijerheide, NAC, PSV Eindhoven and Xerxes
Promoted from 2nd Division: VVH Heerlen
Eerste Klasse D:
Moving in from Division C: SBV Excelsior, Juliana, MVV Maastricht and Willem II
Promoted from 2nd Division: EBOH

Divisions

Eerste Klasse A

Eerste Klasse B

Eerste Klasse C

Eerste Klasse D

Championship play-off

References
RSSSF Netherlands Football League Championships 1898-1954

Netherlands Football League Championship seasons
1953–54 in Dutch football
Neth